DF2 can refer to:

 Delta Force 2 DF2
 Star Wars Jedi Knight: Dark Forces II
 China Railways DF2